Rilko Florov (born 20 August 1948) is a Bulgarian weightlifter. He competed in the men's lightweight event at the 1968 Summer Olympics.

References

1948 births
Living people
Bulgarian male weightlifters
Olympic weightlifters of Bulgaria
Weightlifters at the 1968 Summer Olympics
Place of birth missing (living people)